The two-toed earless skink (Hemiergis quadrilineatus) is a common species of skink found in coastal south-western, Western Australia. It is characterized by its long tail, an absence of ear-holes, shiny skin, yellow underside, and short weak limbs, each of which with only two toes. It can grow to be over 10 cm in length, however the average size is approximately 7.5 cm. It also exhibits a snake-like movement, and due to the small size and non-functionality of limbs in locomotion, it is often referred to as a legless lizard.

It typically inhabits bushland and scrub, however it is commonly found in Perth suburban backyards amongst leaves or under rocks.

References

Hemiergis
Reptiles of Western Australia
Reptiles described in 1839
Skinks of Australia
Taxa named by André Marie Constant Duméril
Taxa named by Gabriel Bibron